Linden is a historic home located near Champlain, Essex County, Virginia. and is a -story, three bay, nearly square, brick dwelling in the Federal style. It has a side gable roof and side-passage plan.

Description 
Although some of the lands on the original tract has been sold, Linden Manor house still stands on 204 acres. It is surrounded on three sides by forestry and is located 335 yards from U.S. Hwy 17. Because of the isolation, the house and its immediate surroundings have retained the integrity of a nineteenth-century farm.  The Manor house is the only remaining nineteenth-century building on the site, however, several outbuilding foundations, including a possible smokehouse and kitchen, have been found, in addition to a small, private cemetery. Much of the woodwork dates to the early years of the house, including four carved Greek-style mantels and the pine floors on the first and second stories. The house is a remarkable and little-altered example of nineteenth-century Federal-style architecture and incorporates some of the finest brickwork in Essex County

Also on the property is an unmarked cemetery.

The historic Linden Manor house is on the Virginia Historic Registry and  National Register of Historic Places in 1992.

Manor House (circa 1825) ( Current Renovations of the House )

Federal Style house containing a gross floor area of 5,054 +/- sf. on 4 levels

Entering the English basement level there is a long hall with pine flooring, a large dining room w/fireplace.  The kitchen with a fireplace, blue tile, oak cabinetry furnished in casual, farmhouse comfort. The basement also has a utility room which includes washer and dryer hook-up as well as a bathroom.

On the main level is the entry hall, off which is a large parlor w/fireplace, plaster walls and dentil crown molding.  To the rear of the main floor is another parlor w/pine flooring, built-in bookcases and dentil trim.  At the end of the hall is a sunroom. The Dining room, fireplace, pine flooring  with touches of farmhouse chic.  

On the second level  original pine wood flooring, dentil crown molding, stairway and banister

.Sunroom with outside access through French doors, a few steps away from the shrub bordered processional path through the tiered lawn, to the woodside pergola.

-Grand Hall with outside access through the front door, onto a covered porch (9’ x 10’), only a few steps away from the entrance to the front lawn and shrub-bordered processional path.  

   –Library, fireplace, built-in oak shelving in a casual repose, outside access onto a lovely, furnished porch (12’ x 12’) overlooking the perennial flower garden.  

   –Formal Parlor, with fireplace and Victorian antiquities presenting simple elegance.

Third level enters a large hall with original pine flooring, dentil crown molding, and:

   -(2) large bedrooms with (2) private, full baths, tiled floors

>Fourth level offers spectacular views of the grounds bathed in the afternoon sunlight

  -(2) cozy bedrooms and (2) full baths

There are 2 porches.  The front covered porch is raised and measures 9' x 10'.  The covered side porch measures 12' x 12'

Carriage House

Located close by to the historic Linden Manor House, the Carriage House is a cozy, reproduction of an early 19th-century carriage house where horse carriages were stored

This brick 2 story structure was constructed in 1992, and has a gable roof, solid masonry foundation, framed dormers and covered front porch w/brick floor (794 +/- sf. footprint and 1,282 +/- total sf).

Access to the upper level is via the outdoor stairs leading to a raised wood deck (4' x 19').

The main level features a large living room/bedroom w/fireplace, ceramic tile flooring and bathroom w/Jacuzzi tub,

The upper level has pine flooring and includes 2 guestrooms each with connecting bathroom with Tile tile flooring

Event Hall

Located close by to the historic Linden Manor House, & the Carriage House - This brick structure was constructed in 1999 - to accommodate ANY needs from the very small to the very large

Linden's grounds 
As stories are told, this magnificent estate was likely named ‘Linden’ in the early nineteenth century because ‘Linden’ trees grew on the property. ‘Linden’ trees are celebrated in numerous ethnic, religious, legal, and cultural affiliations, renowned poetry and mythical mysteries are published and shared, but the symbolic representation of the ‘Linden’ tree remains the same throughout: ‘Justice, Truth, Peace, Love, Prosperity, Friendship, Tenderness, Affection, Good Luck, and Fidelity’.

With whispers of these profoundly important symbols from the century-old trees, we stop, and we listen to the soothing peacefulness of the estate. Small, pea rock gravel crunch crunches on the long, scenic driveway, and a quiet calmness floats from the grain fields to surround you and your guests with natural harmony. Casually meander the grounds as green grass tickles your barefoot toes or regally repose sparkling diamonds in early 19th-century architecture and antiquities. Celebrate, create new beginnings, Linden style

History 
1808-1792:

Merriday Brown, a watchmaker and planter, purchased 213 ½ acres of land in Essex County from Samuel and Elizabeth Mosely Faulconer and Nicholas and Rachel Faulconer on May 18, 1792. During Merriday Brown's life, he increased the size of the tract by acquiring additional land and by 1799, the farm amounted to 500 acres. By the time of Merriday's death in 1808, the farm had been reduced to 332 acres. In his will, dated March 23, 1808, Merriday left the land and farm utensils, stocks of horse, cattle, hogs and sheep to his son, Lewis Brown. By then, it was a thriving agricultural property, and by 1820 its buildings were valued at $200.  Brown family member insists Linden Manor house was built in 1750

1808 - 1825 : Owner: Lewis Brown

Lewis Brown, who died between the fall of 1824 and 1826, left his property to his widow and his son, Richard Lewis Brown, who inherited the entire estate after his mother's death, In 1826, the tax collector reassessed the property upwards and increased the value of the buildings to $1,500.

1826-1838 : Richard Lewis Brown

Richard Worked then Land and Then in1938 sold 438 acres to Albert G. O’Neale in 1838.

1838 – 1851 Owner: Albert G. O’Neale

By 1850, the value of the farm was $8,000. The major crop was Indian corn (1,200 bushels), wheat (300 bushels), hay (1 ton), and oats (100 bushels) were the secondary crops. Small quantities of tobacco, sweet potatoes, Irish potatoes, orchard products, honey, butter, peas, and beans also were grown. owned the property for 13 years, selling part, 249 ½ acres with the house, to his cousin, Mrs. Sarah Jane Ellis in 1851.

1851-1927

Mrs. Ellis had one son, William L., and three daughters: Sarah Ann, who married John H. Pitts,

Jane M., and Lelia, who married James W. Smith. 

Miss Jane Ellis and her sister, Mrs. Sara Pitts and her two children John and Kate Pitts continued to live at Linden until 1927 when Miss Kate Pitts died.

The property went through a long succession of owners following Sarah Ellis's demise.

1927 –          Owner: Nannie & Hayes, T Pitts

1931 -           Owner: Imogene & Grissom Haynes

1937 –          Owner: W. A. & Maude Egerton

1941 –          Owner:  Imogene Egerton Hayes

1973- 1974  Owner: WW, Jones, N.P., Murray, I. M., Imogene McGinnis

One or more of the early-twentieth-century owners constructed the barn and tin-sided shed.

1974–1990   Owner: Emory Carlton and his son-in-law, Henry Scroeder,

They renovated the manor house and added exterior porches. The major alteration to the exterior was the addition of three Roman temple-style porches.

The Pounsberry's purchased the property in 1990.

1990- 2005 Owner: K Pounsberry

According to local lore, Mr. & Mrs. Pounsberry transformed Linden into a top-notch event venue with bed and breakfast amenities. Hearsay is they were masterful chefs and drew local acclaim for their specialty dishes and warm, inviting hospitality. It was Sold to ADJ Ellis in 2006

2006-2010 Linden House Plantation (ADJ Ellis) Was Sold again to A.N. Johnston III in 2010.

2010 -2017 A.N. Johnston III (as Linden House Plantation) - utilized as a bed and breakfast - Property was Put in Estate J. Robert Yeaman III, Executor

2018 -2019 - Nash N. Johnston  Property was Sold at Auction -to Farmers’ LLC, Kent and Sharon Farmer

2019-2022

Kent and Sharon Farmer purchased the historic Linden property from the estate of Nash N. Johnston in 2019. The buildings were previously unoccupied and grounds dormant for several years, as it waited for new owners. Farmer's, LLC, with the assistance of several contractors, family members, and friends have lovingly dedicated many hours to rehabilitating and repairing the buildings and grounds in a manner respectful of its historic nature and community prominence.

Plans are currently underway to open and share this beautiful treasure with the public as a new, revitalized event venue

References

Houses on the National Register of Historic Places in Virginia
Federal architecture in Virginia
Houses completed in 1825
Houses in Essex County, Virginia
National Register of Historic Places in Essex County, Virginia